Clay & Paper Theatre is a community arts theatre company in Toronto, Ontario, Canada that produces narrative theatre using large-scale puppets, masks, stilts, visual imagery, music, and poetry. A fundamental component of Clay & Paper Theatre's mandate is social inclusion.

Origins

Clay & Paper Theatre was founded in 1994 by its artistic director, David Anderson. David helped to establish the organization in community-centered Dufferin Grove Park, Toronto, where they have a small workshop and storage facility.

Festivals

Clay & Paper Theatre delivers an annual multidisciplinary summer festival called Day of Delight. Coinciding with summer solstice, Day of Delight is a celebration of love, courtship and desire.

Plays

Each summer, Clay & Paper Theatre produces a new Canadian play which runs for up to 5 weeks in Dufferin Grove Park.  These plays are built, rehearsed and performed in full public view and admission to all performances is on a pay what you can basis.

Community Parades

Occurring in late October on the Saturday before Halloween, Night of Dread is an annual community event in which giant puppets and images of fears are paraded through the streets and then burned in a bonfire at Dufferin Grove Park with live music, dancing and fire spinning.  Attracting thousands of revelers, 2010 marks the eleventh annual Night of Dread celebration.

Projects

Puppets Without Barriers (2009) Project Partners: Centre for Learning Technologies at Ryerson University (now Toronto Metropolitan University) and Picasso Pro. Funded by the Department of Canadian Heritage.

An accessibility initiative to reduce barriers to audiences who are blind or deaf. Basic adaptations have been made to scripts and programs as well as additional interpretation including ASL, audio description, tactile tours, Braille and Large-print.

Cyclops: Cycling Oriented Puppet Squad (2009-current) Project Partners: Toronto Cyclists Union (now Cycle Toronto), Bike Pirates, Sweet Pete's.  Funded by the Ontario Trillium Foundation.

Clay & Paper Theatre's 3-year bicycle-based theatre project. This 4-person mobile performance squad animates and energizes environmental and cycling events across Toronto, bringing theatre and cycling enthusiasm to the unsuspecting public, drawing attention to urban environmental issues and promoting active living.

Building Local Stories (1998-current) Project Partners: Friends of Dufferin Grove Park.

Productions

Art Ambulance II (2022)

Art Ambulance (2021)

The Echoes Project II: Pigeon Pie (2019)

The Echoes Project (2018)

Animal Nature (2014 - 2015)  

Our Last Best Hope (2013) 

Day of Delight (2013) 

A History of Forgetting (2012) 

The Pedaler's Wager (2010) 

The Circus of Dark & Light (2010)

Night of Dread (2011) 

Cycling Oriented Puppet Squad (2011) 

Night of Dread (2010)

Day of Delight (2010)

Between Sea & Sky (2009)

Bicycle Revolution (2009)

Leap Year Pudding (2009)

Puppets On Ice (2009)

Song of the Innocents (2008)

Horse Feathers (2008)  

Night Of Dread (2008)

Day of Delight (2008)

Night of Dread (2007)

We Need Help! (2007)

Day of Delight (2007)

Puppets on Ice (2007)

Night of Dread (2006)

Camões, the One-Eyed Poet of Portugal (2006)

Night of Dread (2005)

The Space Between (2005)

Lilith (2004)

Day of Delight (2004)

Puppets on Ice (2004)

Night of Dread (2003)

Day of Delight (2003)

Puppets on Ice (2003)

The Sylliad (2003)

GOLD in Dufferin Grove Park (2002)

Night of Dread (2002)

Night of Dread (2001)

Night of Dread (2000)

The Lost City of Wagadu (2000)

Lilith Unfair (1999)

The Ballad of Garrison Creek (1998)

Democracy (1998)

The Epic of Mael Duin (1998)

The Resurrection of Fornax (1997)

The Return of Green Man (1995 to present)

Gilgamesh (1994 to 1996)

Awards and honors

2009 Davenport Community Builders Award (David Anderson)

2008 Short listed for William Kilbourn Award for the Celebration of Toronto's Cultural Life (David Anderson)

2007 Chalmers Arts Fellowship, Ontario Arts Council (David Anderson)

See also
Community art
Community theatre
Puppetry
Jumblies Theatre
Kensington Market

External links
 Clay & Paper Theatre
 Great Public Spaces
 Picasso Pro
 Friends of Dufferin Grove Park
 Centre for Learning Technologies Ryerson University

References

Theatre companies in Toronto
Community theatre